Mick Pikos (born 21 June 1954) is an Australian former wrestler who competed in the 1980 Summer Olympics and in the 1996 Summer Olympics.

References

External links
 

1954 births
Living people
Greek emigrants to Australia
Olympic wrestlers of Australia
Wrestlers at the 1980 Summer Olympics
Wrestlers at the 1996 Summer Olympics
Commonwealth Games silver medallists for Australia
Wrestlers at the 1978 Commonwealth Games
Australian male sport wrestlers
Commonwealth Games medallists in wrestling
Medallists at the 1978 Commonwealth Games